Elma Karlowa (March 12, 1932 – December 31, 1994) was a Yugoslav film and television actress.

Selected filmography
 Once I Will Return (1953)
 A Child of the Community (1953)
 Guitars of Love (1954)
 Cabaret (1954)
 Love's Carnival (1955)
 Royal Hunt in Ischl (1955)
 The Beggar Student (1956)
 The Girl Without Pyjamas (1957)
 Greetings and Kisses from Tegernsee (1957)
 Almenrausch and Edelweiss (1957)
 The Csardas King (1958)
 Do Not Send Your Wife to Italy (1960)
 The Post Has Gone (1962)
 Holiday in St. Tropez (1964)
 Crime and Passion (1976)
 The Unicorn (1978)

References

Bibliography
 Fritsche, Maria. Homemade Men in Postwar Austrian Cinema: Nationhood, Genre and Masculinity. Berghahn Books, 2013.

External links

1932 births
1994 deaths
Croatian television actresses
Croatian film actresses
Yugoslav emigrants to Germany
Actresses from Zagreb
20th-century Croatian actresses
Yugoslav film actresses
Yugoslav television actresses